Serra Dourada is a municipality in the Brazilian state of Bahia.  In 2020, the estimated population was 17,321.

References

Municipalities in Bahia